Brindley Farm is a historic home and farm located near Wilmington, New Castle County, Delaware. The house, known as Crooked Billet, was built about 1750, and is a -story, five bay, stone structure, with later rear wings and a modern side porch. Also on the property are a contributing frame barn and carriage house, dated to 1807. The property has been owned by only two families since 1750, and the house once operated as an inn or tavern.  The Du Pont family has owned the property since 1864.

It was added to the National Register of Historic Places in 1976.

References

Houses on the National Register of Historic Places in Delaware
Farms on the National Register of Historic Places in Delaware
Houses completed in 1750
Houses in Wilmington, Delaware
National Register of Historic Places in Wilmington, Delaware